Events in the year 2002 in Kerala.

Incumbents 

Governors of Kerala

 Sukhdev Singh Kang (till April)
 Sikander Bakht (since April)

Chief minister of Kerala – A. K. Antony

Events 

 February 6 - Government employees and teachers in Kerala started indefinite strike.
 October 1 - Kerala State Road Transport Corporation launches Volvo B7R buses in Thiruvananthapuram - Kozhikode and Thiruvananthapuram - Palakkad routes and becomes the third government transport company in India to achieve this feat.
 November 18 - A. P. J. Abdul Kalam inaugurates Akshaya project a Computer literacy and governance through ICT project of Government of Kerala.

Deaths 

 January 6 - Kunjandi, 82, actor.
 June 19 - N. F. Varghese, 53, actor.
 July 1 - Saswathikananda, 52, head of Sivagiri mutt.
 December 23 - Ratheesh, 48, actor.

See also 

 History of Kerala
 2002 in India

References 

2000s in Kerala